Hervey Bay is a city on the coast of the Fraser Coast Region of  Queensland, Australia. It is located on the bay of the same name open to the Coral Sea between the Queensland mainland and nearby Fraser Island (also known as K'Gari and Gari). The local economy relies on tourism which is based primarily around whale watching in Platypus Bay to the north, ferry access to Fraser Island, accessible recreational fishing and boating and the natural north facing, calm beaches with wide undeveloped foreshore zones. In October 2019, Hervey Bay was named the First Whale Heritage Site in the world by the World Cetacean Alliance, for its commitment to and practices of sustainable whale and dolphin watching. A 2010 study by Deakin University showed that people on the Fraser Coast area including Hervey Bay, were the happiest in Australia. At June 2018, there were an estimated 54,674 people in Hervey Bay, having grown by an annual average of 1.31% year-on-year over the preceding five years.

History

Butchulla (also known as Batjala, Badtjala, Badjela, and Badjala) is the language of the Fraser Coast region, including K’gari. Butchulla language region includes the landscape within the local government boundaries of the Fraser Coast Regional Council, particularly the towns of Maryborough and Hervey Bay extending south towards Double Island Point and north to Burrum Heads.

The indigenous Batjala people including the Kabi Kabi  are the traditional residents of Hervey Bay. Batjala means Bat-No and Jala-tongu. The first recorded European sighting of Hervey Bay was made by James Cook while carrying out his running survey of the east coast of Australia, on 22 May 1770. By noon Cook's ship was in a position a little over half-way across the opening of Hervey Bay heading for Bundaberg. When Cook first discovered Hervey Bay, he did not realize that Fraser Island was separated from mainland Australia; Cook did not travel far enough south due to the shallow depths of the waters in the Bay. Cook named the bay "Hervey's Bay" after Augustus John Hervey (1724–1779), later Third Earl of Bristol, a naval officer who became a Lord of the Admiralty the year Endeavour returned.

Until around the mid-1980s the area was serviced by a rail link from the main North Coast line that diverted from Aldershot and went through Takura, Walligan, Nikenbah, then on to Pialba and Urangan. The line was a major freight point for the Port of Maryborough and for the sugar cane industry until road transport assumed the role.

In 1984, Hervey Bay was officially known as the "City of Hervey Bay". It was known as a city because of its large growth in business, population, tourism, and industry. Although it was now being known as a city, it still remained a small seaside village to most of the local residents.

The Hervey Bay Library opened in 1997 and had a major refurbishment in 2014.

Aboriginal and Torres Strait Islander people made up 4.0% of the population. The median age of people was 48 years, ten years older than the national median age. 74.6% of people were born in Australia. The next most common countries of birth were England 5.9%, New Zealand 3.5%, Germany 0.8%, Scotland 0.6%, and Philippines 0.6%. 88.4% of people only spoke English at home. Other languages spoken at home included German 0.5%, French 0.2%, Mandarin 0.2%, Dutch 0.2%, and Italian 0.2%. The most common responses for religion were no religion 28.0%, Anglican 20.5%, and Catholic 18.9%.

Heritage listings
Hervey Bay has a number of heritage-listed sites. K'gari is listed on the World Heritage List. The Woody Island Lighthouses are listed on the Queensland Heritage Register.

Transport

Hervey Bay is situated approximately 3½ hours' drive north of Brisbane, via the Bruce Highway and 30 minutes' drive north-east of Maryborough. The city is also served by the high-speed Tilt Train, which has connections from Maryborough West or nearby Howard. The city is served by the Hervey Bay Airport, with direct flights from Brisbane (QantasLink) and Sydney (Virgin Australia). The City of Hervey Bay (now the Fraser Coast Region) has released an airport master plan which includes future provision of a taxiway parallel to the main runway, additional car parking and a larger terminal. The city is also served by passenger ferry to Fraser Island, as well as both scheduled and unscheduled vehicular ferries.

Railway

Despite Hervey Bay's growing popularity, no plans have been made for a new railway line to the city. The previous passenger and freight line branched off the North Coast main line at Colton, just north of Maryborough. Trains stopped at many stations along the line, but the main stations were Pialba and Urangan. The railway then extended along the Urangan Pier. The line carried out pineapples and local goods from the city. The line was closed in 1993. The tracks from Nikenbah to Urangan were removed and the Pialba – Urangan line was converted into a rail trail. Traces of the railway line are still visible in Urangan. There are two semi-removed crossings (Everything but the tracks was removed) near the end of Pier Street and the track's ballast is still slightly visible from where the mobility corridor ends.

Governance
Hervey Bay is the largest population centre within the Fraser Coast Region. The current mayor of the Fraser Coast Regional Council is George Seymour first elected in a by-election held in May 2018 and re-elected in the 2020 quadrennial local government elections in March 2020. A total of ten Councillors are elected every four years.

The Electoral district of Hervey Bay has Queensland's second highest share of residents aged over 60.

Hervey Bay is represented in the Parliament of Queensland by Labor member Adrian Tantari, and in the Commonwealth Parliament by the Nationals member for Hinkler, Keith Pitt.

Climate
The coast is predominantly affected by the south east trade winds throughout the summer with occasional strong northerly winds and storm swells. These winds keep the temperatures down in summer and up in winter, preventing temperature extremes.

Tropical cyclones are a threat at times with Cyclone Hamish threatening in 2009 as a Category 5. The land mass of Fraser Island significantly affects the pattern of weather in Hervey Bay and protects the immediate marine environment from open ocean storm effects. Cyclone Oswald in 2013 caused significant damage in the area, mainly as a result of tornadoes spawned by the system. December to March is the main rainy period, with a secondary peak in May and June. The months of April and from July to November are generally dry and sunny.

Localities

Hervey Bay began as a dispersed community spread over numerous small, seaside villages. As the area grew, these communities amalgamated and became suburbs . The current urban area includes the following settlements:
 Booral
 Bunya Creek
 Craignish
 Dundowran
 Dundowran Beach
 Eli Waters
 Kawungan
 Nikenbah
 Pialba
 Point Vernon
 Scarness
 Sunshine Acres
 Susan River
 Takura
 Toogoom
 Torquay
 Urangan
 Urraween
 Walligan
 Wondunna

Education
Hervey Bay has 14 schools.

Hervey Bay also has two Higher Education institutes, a campus of the University of the Sunshine Coast and the Wide Bay Institute of TAFE. and a State Government Special School.

Amenities 
The Fraser Coast Regional Council operate the Hervey Bay Library at 161 Old Maryborough Road, Pialba.

LifeChurch Hervey Bay meets at the Community Centre at 22 Charles Street in Pialba. It is part of the Wesleyan Methodist Church of Australia.

Media 
Along with a number of other regional Australian newspapers owned by NewsCorp, the Hervey Bay Independent newspaper ceased publication in June 2020.

In April 2022, the Australian Broadcasting Corporation opened a bureau at Hervey Bay to improve its coverage of the Fraser Coast. Staffed by two locally-based journalists, the new bureau on Boat Harbour Drive was opened as part of the ABC's regional expansion.

Commerce
Hervey Bay and the Fraser Coast region's largest shopping centre is Stockland Hervey Bay. It is a regional shopping center located in the suburb of Urraween. Stockland Acquired the centre in April 2011, at the time it had a floor area of 15,600 square meters, and 48 stores. In 2013 Stockland begun construction of a $115 million redevelopment that would double the floor area to over 35,000 square metres. The development would include an additional 70 specialty stores and a 500-seat food court, taking the total number of stores to 110.

Sports
Hervey Bay has an active sporting community with the geography and climate encouraging a diverse range of activities.

Competition sports are generally regional and played against nearby cities, Bundaberg, Maryborough and Gympie.

The calm waters and gently sloped beaches make recreational and competitive water sports popular and accessible. These include sailing, kite boarding, water skiing, wake boarding, kayaking, out-rigging, snorkelling, scuba diving, and ocean swimming.

The Hervey Bay Triathlon started in 1988 and has been raced annually since.

The local rugby league team, Hervey Bay Seagulls, are the cornerstone of rugby league in the Hervey Bay area.

Whale watching

Hervey Bay is the whale watching capital of Australia, with humpback whales migrating along the coast between April and October every year. Researchers at The Oceania Project conducted a 25-year study which found the bay was an important social hub for humpback whales. Whale number have increased from about 2,000 in 1992, to around 33,000 in 2018. Hervey Bay is a stopover for mature female humpback whales. Mature females visit Hervey Bay during August in company with the cohort of immature males and females. During September and October Hervey Bay is dominated by Mature females with new calves. The humpback whales are known to be very relaxed in the company of the whale watching vessels. Southern right whales have also been recorded with increasing sighting rates.

Sister cities
According to the Australian Sister Cities Association, Hervey Bay has two sister cities:
 Otsuki, Japan
 Leshan, China.

See also

 Urangan Pier
Great Sandy Biosphere Reserve

 Secret Side of Hervey Bay from World War II

References

External links

 
 
 Town maps: Sheet 1, Sheet 2, Sheet 3, Sheet 4
 Hervey Bay
 Old Hervey Bay City Council Website 

 
Coastal cities in Australia
Bays of Queensland